Cembrit is a distributor and manufacturer of fibre-cement products in Europe and offers a range of fibre-cement based products for roofing, interior cladding and exterior cladding.

With more than 25 million square meters produced, Cembrit Holding A/S is one of the largest European manufacturers of facade and buildings panels as well as fibre cement corrugated sheets. The company offers systems for the design of facades, for roofing, for the lining of interior walls and function panels for various building constructions.

History
In 1910, Russian Tsar Nicholas II commissioned the Danish company FLSmidth & Co. to build three plants for the processing of fibre cement. Unfortunately, the Russian Revolution broke out in 1917 before the total equipment was ready to be shipped. One of the packaged units was in the FLSmidth & Co. warehouse for 13 years until the company decided to start its own subsidiary dedicated to the production of fibre cement boards. The Dansk Eternit plant in the city of Aalborg began production in 1927.

In 1938, the name "Cembrit" was first introduced as a trademark for export activities of the company. It derives from the term Cimbri, the name of a nomadic tribe from northern Denmark, which around 100 BC. conquered large parts of Europe.

Until the 1980s, the Dansk Eternit plant grew and expanded through a series of acquisitions of other fibre cement manufacturers and distributors. The change of name to Cembrit Holding A/S took place 2008. Today, Cembrit Holding A / S has subsidiaries in 20 countries. The headquarter is still based in Aalborg, Denmark.

In 2014, the Swedish SoLiX Group AB acquired Cembrit Holding A/S. SoLiX designed a growth strategy for Cembrit based on new products and services as well as extensive investment in optimising of plants, research and development. Cembrit Holding A/S employs around 1500 people worldwide.

Headquarters and plants 
Cembrit Holding A/S is headquartered in Aalborg, Denmark, where R&D and all the main activities are made. The company operates plants in Finland, the Czech Republic, Hungary and Poland.

Production

Fibre cement 
Fibre cement is a particularly robust and weather-resistant building material that is suitable for all types of exterior and interior wall coverings as well as roofing. The combination of polyvinyl alcohol (PVA) fibres with cellulose fibres and cement creates a lightweight, yet durable, non-combustible building material. Fibre cement panels, panels and panels create durable and resilient structures that meet the requirements for cost-effective construction, durability and low maintenance.

References

External links 
 http://www.cembrit.com

Construction and civil engineering companies of Denmark
Companies based in Aalborg
Danish companies established in 1927
Construction and civil engineering companies established in 1927